Time of Your Life was a Canadian television soap opera which ran production from August 1988 to May 1989. It was created by producer Harry Jakobs and Maryse Wilder, Rhea Cohen and Maurice Thevenet. The series was loosely based on the low budget Canadian independent feature Rebel High (a modern 1980s High School Confidential). It debuted on October 17, 1988, and was aired right after the American soap opera General Hospital at 4pm, daily Monday through Friday replacing Bob Barker's The Price Is Right. Making it at the time Canada's first daily syndicated soap opera with all 130 episodes shot two weeks in advance to air date until completion of the first-season cliffhanger.

Storylines
The series covered many subjects including drug use, rape, cults, suicide, alcoholism, bullying, abortion, pornography and homosexuality.

Cast
 Jason Cavalier Leboeuf as Mickey
 Dawna Wightman as Phoebe
 Ara Carrera as Christine
 Kara Feifer as Lisa
 Scott Armstrong as James
 Alan Legros as Eddie
 David Lipper as Kevin
 Richard Raybourne as Matt
 Francoise Robertson as Laura
 Lana Higgins as Helen
 Desmond Gallant as Evan

Production
The series was shot in Montreal, in a studio with built sets in an industrial lot warehouse on Royalmount and The Decarie Expressway near Montreal's racetrack Blue Bonnets and Orange Julep.

Crew
 Avinoam Damari .... director
 Stephen G Blanchard .... production manager
 Mark Feifer .... executive producer

Writers
The writing team experienced extreme turnover during the first (and only) season. The first lead writer, for example, remained with the show for only two weeks.

 Nancy Klein         ... Lead Writer
 Evan Keliher        ... Lead Writer
 Bryan Zako          ... Lead Writer
 Stanley Whyte       ... Writer
 Nick Rotari         ... Writer
 Greg Lipper         ... Writer

Broadcast
The series was syndicated in French Quebecois, and in international markets such as Israel, France, Australia, and Mexico, including eastern parts of the United States under the title Campus.

Trivia
 Cinar studios which is well known for producing award-winning animated children's series such as Caillou was where the French translations were post produced by Natalie Rosen.
 RDS CEO Dominic Vanelli was once a floor manager.
 Award-winning DOP David Franco (Graceland w Kevin Costner) was one of the first camera ops to become DOP on the series.
 The local hang out for the kids on the series was called Harry's Place, named after producer and co-creator Harry Jakobs.
 During mid-season, production stopped due to a strike by the cast who felt underpaid. The cast got a raise, and production resumed.
 The series was syndicated in Canada and around the world, becoming very popular in some countries.

External links 
 

1980s Canadian drama television series
1988 Canadian television series debuts
1989 Canadian television series endings
Canadian television soap operas
Television shows set in Montreal